Casillas is a municipality of Spain in Ávila, autonomous community Castile and León.

Area and Population
It has a surface area of 11.96 km² with a population of 815 inhabitants and a density of 68.14 inhabitants per km².

References

Municipalities in the Province of Ávila